Good Vibrations is a 1992 Australian mini series about a family who discover their house is a portal to the afterlife. It was shot from 1 July to 2 August 1991.

Cast
 Stephen Whittaker - Raf
 Genevieve Picot - Kate Reiner
 Felicity Soper - Sky
 Alan Hopgood - Cec
 Sasha Close - Lily
 William McInnes - David
 David Hoflin - Donovan
 Jeffrey Walker - David
 Grant Dodwell - Leo
 Mandy Salomon - Judy Bruin
 Richard Norton - Sonny
 Melissa Jaffer - Annie
 Neil Melville - Jim
 Terry Gill - Fred
 Vic Gordon - Old Joe

References

External links
Good Vibrations at IMDb

1990s Australian television miniseries
1992 Australian television series debuts
1992 Australian television series endings
1992 television films
1992 films
English-language television shows